Zubchaty is an uninhabited island in Shelikhov Gulf of the northeastern Sea of Okhotsk. It lies on the eastern side of Penzhina Bay. It has a serrated summit. 

It is within the Tigilsky District of Kamchatka Krai, in the Russian Far East.

History

American whaleships cruised for bowhead whales off the island from 1863 to 1889. They called it Crag Island.

See also
Islands of the Sea of Okhotsk
Islands of the Russian Far East

References

Islands of the Russian Far East
Islands of the Sea of Okhotsk
Islands of Kamchatka Krai
Uninhabited islands of Russia